PA33 may refer to:
 Pennsylvania Route 33
 Pennsylvania's 33rd congressional district
 Piper PA-33 Comanche